(born December 5, 1959) is a Japanese sprint canoer who competed in the mid-1990s. At the 1996 Summer Olympics in Atlanta, she was eliminated in the repechages of the K-2 500 m event and the semifinals of the K-4 500 m event.

External links
Sports-Reference.com profile

1969 births
Canoeists at the 1996 Summer Olympics
Japanese female canoeists
Living people
Olympic canoeists of Japan
Asian Games medalists in canoeing
Canoeists at the 1994 Asian Games
Medalists at the 1994 Asian Games
Asian Games bronze medalists for Japan